Kim Lilja (born January 6, 1994) is a Swedish ice hockey player. He is currently playing with Luleå HF of the Swedish Hockey League (SHL).

Lilja made his Swedish Hockey League debut playing with Luleå HF during the 2013–14 season.

References

External links

1994 births
Living people
Luleå HF players
Swedish ice hockey left wingers
People from Luleå
Sportspeople from Norrbotten County